EquinoxAir S.A.S, operating as Equair, is an airline headquartered in Quito, Ecuador.

As of January 10, 2022, it operates domestic flights, between Quito, Guayaquil and the Galápagos Islands. The airline now competes with the Ecuadorian subsidiaries of Avianca and LATAM, as well as Aeroregional.

History
Equair was founded in October 2020 as EquinoxAir. It started its formation process with the authorities, and in March 2021 it got assigned some of the frequencies to the Baltra and San Cristóbal islands that TAME used to operate before its dissolution.

On November 16, 2021, the company was officially presented and the Equair brand was revealed in an event that took place in Centro de Convenciones Bicentenario, Quito.

On December 4, 2021, Equair received the first aircraft of its fleet, a Boeing 737-700. This aircraft was ferried from Lleida, Spain to Latacunga, Ecuador with stopovers in Reykjavík, Iceland and Boston, United States.

Equair was expected to have its inaugural flight, between Quito and Guayaquil on December 22, 2021, but was delayed to January 2022 due to a COVID-19 outbreak between the employees of the airline.

On January 7, 2022, the airline received its operation certificate from the Ecuadorian Civil Aviation General Directorate, after a demonstration flight to the Galápagos Islands was carried out. Then, on January 10, 2022, the airline had its inaugural flight between Quito and Guayaquil.

Equair introduced its frequent flyer program on May 17, 2022 under the "Cacao Miles" name. Besides accruing miles, the program offers discounts with affiliates and in-flight perks.

Destinations
The airline focuses its operations on domestic flights between Quito and Guayaquil, and the Galápagos Islands.

Fleet
As of November 2022, the Equair fleet includes the following aircraft:

See also
List of airlines of Ecuador

References

External links
Official website

Airlines of Ecuador
2020 establishments in Ecuador
Airlines established in 2020